Finanzamt Köln Altstadt v Schumacker (1995) C-279/93 is an EU law case, concerning the free movement of workers in the European Union.

Facts
Roland Schumacker argued that he should get extra tax benefits in Germany. He was Belgian, lived in Belgium and worked in Germany. He paid German income tax, but was denied benefits that resident taxpayers received. Germany argued that it was hard to determine the income received by non-residents in their state of residence to assess deductions.

Judgment
The Court of Justice held that a non-resident taxpayer who receives almost all income in a state of employment is objectively comparable to someone who does the same work there. It followed that Schumacker should be entitled to the tax benefits.

See also

European Union law

Notes

References

European Union labour case law